Giselle Bonilla (born October 28, 1994) is an American actress. She is best known for her role as Maria in the sitcom Mr. Box Office.

Career
She has appeared in many television series, including a recurring role in Southland. She has also helped advertise many campaigns including YMI Jeans, Verizon Wireless, and an anti-smoking campaign. On May 7, 2012, she joined the cast of theseries Mr. Box Office.

Personal life
She enjoys playing basketball and swimming.

Filmography

References

External links
 

Living people
American television actresses
21st-century American actresses
1994 births